Pheasant Creek is a  long 1st order tributary to the Fisher River in Surry County, North Carolina.

Course
Pheasant Creek rises about 1 mile northeast of Little Richmond, North Carolina.  Pheasant Creek then flows southeast to join the Fisher River about 1 mile northeast of Crutchfield, North Carolina.

Watershed
Pheasant Creek drains  of area, receives about 48.5 in/year of precipitation, has a wetness index of 375.98, and is about 45% forested.

See also
List of rivers of North Carolina

References

Rivers of North Carolina
Rivers of Surry County, North Carolina